Alessandro Zoppetti (born 28 March 1979 in Casalpusterlengo) is an Italian football defender who currently plays for Giulianova.

Zoppetti came through the ranks of Cremonese as a teenager, where he was snapped up by Reggina. He failed to establish himself with the amaranto and was subsequently sent out on loan to several Serie B clubs.

He signed a 3-year contract with  Pescara  in 2005.

References

External links
 Zoppetti's career profile (from Pisa Calcio official website)
 Zoppetti's career profile (from Gazzetta dello Sport website)

1979 births
Living people
People from Casalpusterlengo
Italian footballers
Association football defenders
U.S. Cremonese players
Reggina 1914 players
U.S. Lecce players
U.S. Salernitana 1919 players
Ascoli Calcio 1898 F.C. players
Catania S.S.D. players
Treviso F.B.C. 1993 players
Delfino Pescara 1936 players
Pisa S.C. players
A.C. Perugia Calcio players
Giulianova Calcio players
Footballers from Lombardy
Sportspeople from the Province of Lodi